The following is a list of MTV Asia Awards winners for Favourite Artist Malaysia.

MTV Asia Awards